Paramusonius affinis is a species of beetle in the family Cerambycidae. It was described by Stephan von Breuning in 1980.

References

Crossotini
Beetles described in 1980